Xhevdet Shaqiri (5 January 1923 – 11 September 1997) was an Albanian football player and coach.

Playing career

Club
He played for Vllaznia Shkodër, Partizani Tirana and Dinamo Tirana during his playing career and won 9 league titles with them. He became the league's top goalscorer in 1946 with 11 goals.

International
He made his debut for Albania in a September 1947 Balkan Cup match against Yugoslavia and earned a total of 14 caps, scoring no goals. His final international was a September 1957 friendly match against China.

Managerial career
After retiring as a player, he coached Dinamo Tirana, KS Lushnja and most notably hometown club Vllaznia for 13 years between 1966 and 1979.

Honours
 as a player
Albanian Superliga: 9
 1946, 1948, 1949, 1950, 1951, 1952, 1953, 1955, 1956

 as a manager
Albanian Superliga: 3
 1972, 1974, 1978

References

1923 births
1997 deaths
Footballers from Shkodër
Albanian footballers
Association football forwards
Albania international footballers
KF Vllaznia Shkodër players
FK Partizani Tirana players
FK Dinamo Tirana players
Kategoria Superiore players
Albanian football managers
FK Dinamo Tirana managers
KS Lushnja managers
KF Vllaznia Shkodër managers
Kategoria Superiore managers